Rudolf Penno (12 May 1896 Undla Parish (now Kadrina Parish), Wierland County – 25 November 1951 Stockholm) was an Estonian politician. He was a member of V Riigikogu.

1934-1937 he was the chairman of V Riigikogu.

References

1896 births
1951 deaths
People from Kadrina Parish
People from Kreis Wierland
Settlers' Party politicians
Members of the Riigikogu, 1923–1926
Members of the Riigikogu, 1926–1929
Members of the Riigikogu, 1929–1932
Members of the Riigikogu, 1932–1934
Members of the Riigivolikogu
Russian military personnel of World War I
Estonian military personnel of the Estonian War of Independence
Estonian people of World War II
Estonian World War II refugees
Estonian emigrants to Sweden